Justice League Queer, or JLQ, is a fictional superhero team appearing in American comic books published by DC Comics. Justice League Queer was an ad-hoc team of LGBTQIA+ heroes formed by Gregorio de la Vega to fight off Eclipso when he attacked a pride parade. The team is a variation on one of DC's long-running properties, the Justice League (originally and sometimes still known as the Justice League of America, commonly abbreviated as "JLA"). The JLQ was originated by Andrew Wheeler and Luciano Vecchio.

Publication history 
DC introduced the concept as one of 16 entries in a bracket tournament called Round Robin, which was announced on DC's Twitter account on March 31, 2021. The public voted for pitches they would like to see as a six-issue miniseries. JLQ was eliminated in the first round.

The inclusion of JLQ in a tournament generated criticism from those who felt that it gave people a platform to anonymously reject representation in comics, "effectively a referendum on the existence of queer superheroes". Though JLQ did not win the tournament, its bracket was the focus of a sizable number of votes. The team debuted in a narrative written by Wheeler in DC Pride #1, a comic book released on June 8, 2021 (which falls during Pride Month in the United States). Their next appearance was in the 2021 holiday anthology comic book ‘Tis the Season to be Freezin’ (cover dated February 2022).

Members 
All members joined in DC Pride #1 (August 2021):
 The Aerie – A gender non-binary terrorist, first appearing in Suicide Squad Volume 6 #1 (February 2020). They are dating Wink and are a metahuman, with organic blue wings.
 Apollo – A gay superhero, also known as Andrew Pulaski, first appearing in StormWatch Volume 2 #4 (February 1998). He is married to Midnighter and is a metahuman with solar abilities, as well as flight, speed, and strength comparable to Superman.
 Aqualad – A half-Atlantean gay superhero, also known as Jackson Hyde, first appearing in Brightest Day #4 (August 2010). As well as possessing superior Atlantean physical attributes, Aqualad can control and create hard constructs out of water.
 Batwoman - A lesbian superhero, also known as Katherine Kane, first appearing in 52 #7 (August 2006). She deploys her considerable combat training and wealth in a never-ending war on crime.
 Bunker – A gay superhero from Mexico, also known as Miguel Barragan, first appearing in Teen Titans Volume 4 #1 (November 2011). Miguel has the metahuman ability to create constructs out of energy bricks, similar to Green Lantern.
 Crush – A lesbian superhero, also known as Xiomara Rojas, first appearing in Teen Titans Special #1 (August 2018). She is the daughter of the Czarnian alien anti-hero Lobo and inherits his considerable strength and regenerative abilities.
 Extraño – A gay superhero sorcerer from Peru, also known as Gregorio de la Vega, first appearing in Millennium #2 (January 1988). He is married to Tasmanian Devil and is one of the DC Universe's top sorcerers.
 Midnighter – A gay superhero first appearing in StormWatch Volume 2 #4 (February 1998). He is married to Apollo. His use of stealth and martial arts combined with a metahumanly high pain tolerance and the ability to predict his opponents' movements to make him a formidable opponent. 
 The Ray – A gay superhero, also known as Raymond Terrill, first appearing in The Ray #1 (February 1992). He has the metahuman ability to manipulate light and radiation, both offensively as well as to fly or turn invisible.
 Shining Knight – A gender non-binary immortal swordfighter from Arthurian England, known as Ystin, first appearing in Seven Soldiers: Shining Knight #1 (May 2005). 
 Steel – A queer superhero, also known as Natasha Irons, first appearing in Steel Volume 2 #1 (February 1994). She uses highly advanced armor and technology made from sentient metal.
 Sylvan "Syl" Ortega – A gay superhero from Brazil who is the magical apprentice to Extraño, first appearing in DC Pride #1 (June 2021). The would-be pajé of an extinct South American tribe, he has a natural affinity for plant-based magic.
 Tasmanian Devil – A gay therianthrope superhero from Australia, also known as Hugh Dawkins, first appearing in Super Friends #9 (December 1977). He is married to Extraño.
 Traci 13 – A bisexual superhero, also known as Traci Thirteen or Traci Thurston, first appearing in Superman Volume 2 #189 (February 2003). She is a member of the homo magi race with magical abilities linked to "the magic of cities".
 Tremor – An asexual Bengali superhero from India, also known as Roshanna Chatterji, first appearing in Secret Six Volume 3 #25 (November 2010). She has the power to create shockwaves.
 Wink – A queer terrorist, first appearing in Suicide Squad Volume 6 #1 (February 2020). She is dating The Aerie and is a metahuman whose power is to teleport short distances at will.

References 

DC Comics superhero teams
DC Comics LGBT superheroes
Superhero comics
Comics characters introduced in 2021
Justice League